Cima de Gagela is a mountain of the Lepontine Alps, located between the Val Calanca and the Mesolcina, in the canton of Graubünden. With a height of 2,805 metres above sea level, it is the highest summit of the range located south of Pass di Passit (2,082 metres). The mountain lies approximately halfway between Rossa and Mesocco.

References

External links
 Cima di Gagela on Hikr

Mountains of the Alps
Mountains of Switzerland
Mountains of Graubünden
Lepontine Alps
Two-thousanders of Switzerland
Rossa, Switzerland
Mesocco